Turricula catena is a species of sea snail, a marine gastropod mollusk in the family Clavatulidae.

Description

Distribution
This species occurs in the Red Sea.

References

 Vine, P. (1986). Red Sea Invertebrates. Immel Publishing, London. 224 pp

catena